The 1926 Notre Dame Fighting Irish football team represented the University of Notre Dame during the 1926 college football season, led by ninth-year head coach Knute Rockne.  The Irish won all but one of their ten games, upset by Carnegie Tech in late November. The team was ranked No. 3 in the nation in the Dickinson System ratings released in December 1926.

Schedule

References

Notre Dame
Notre Dame Fighting Irish football seasons
Notre Dame Fighting Irish football